The 13th Louisiana Infantry Regiment was a unit of volunteers recruited in Louisiana that fought in the Confederate States Army during the American Civil War. The unit was created when four infantry companies were added to the Battalion of Governor's Guards in September 1861. It served during the war in the Western Theater of the American Civil War. The regiment fought at Shiloh, Farmington, and Perryville in 1862. After being reduced in numbers, the regiment was consolidated with the 20th Louisiana Infantry Regiment and served at Stones River, Jackson, Chickamauga, and Missionary Ridge in 1863. The 13th-20th Louisiana fought at Resaca, New Hope Church, Ezra Church, and Nashville in 1864. The consolidation with the 20th Louisiana was discontinued in February 1865 and the regiment was re-consolidated with other units. It fought its final battle at Spanish Fort one month before surrendering in May 1865.

See also
List of Louisiana Confederate Civil War units
Louisiana in the Civil War

Notes

References

 

Units and formations of the Confederate States Army from Louisiana
1861 establishments in Louisiana
Military units and formations established in 1861
1865 disestablishments in Louisiana
Military units and formations disestablished in 1865